The 1937 Colorado A&M Aggies football team was an American football team that represented Colorado A&M (now known as Colorado State University) in the Rocky Mountain Conference (RMC) during the 1937 college football season.  In their 27th season under head coach Harry W. Hughes, the Aggies compiled a 1–7 record (1–6 against RMC opponents), finished last in the RMC, and were outscored by a total of 182 to 6.

Schedule

References

Colorado AandM
Colorado State Rams football seasons
Colorado AandM Aggies football